The East Bengal Club is an Indian professional cricket club based in Kolkata, West Bengal. It participates in various tournaments of varying age groups conducted by the Cricket Association of Bengal. The team plays its home matches mostly at the Eden Gardens and Jadavpur University Campus Ground. 

The club currently participates in the CAB First Division League, CAB Senior Knockout, CAB Super League and JC Mukherjee Trophy. They have so far won 60 major state-level trophies in their history.

History
The East Bengal Club Cricket team has been actively participating in the Cricket Association of Bengal first Division league since the 70s and won their first CAB League title in 1974-75 season jointly with Mohun Bagan.

Many famous names have come and played for the East Bengal Cricket team, including the "Master Blaster" Sachin Tendulkar. Him along with Indian cricket icons Kapil Dev, Ajay Jadeja, Pravin Amre played for the East Bengal cricket team in the 1994 P. Sen Trophy led by Sachin himself which they won defeating Mohun Bagan in the final.

Current squad
The Cricket squad of East Bengal Club for the season 2022–2023

Player(s) with international caps are listed in bold.

Coaching Staff

Honours
List of all Major Tournaments won by East Bengal Club in Cricket:

CAB First Division League
Champions (16): 1974-75, 1977-78, 1978-79, 1980-81, 1983-84, 1993-94, 1994-95, 1998-99, 2000-01, 2001-02, 2005-06, 2006-07, 2009-10, 2011-12, 2013-14, 2016-17

CAB Senior Knockout
Champions (13): 1975-76, 1977-78, 1979-80, 1982-83, 1985-86, 1987-88, 1997-98, 2003-04, 2004-05, 2010-11, 2012-13, 2013-14, 2014-15

J. C. Mukherjee Trophy
Champions (12): 1977-78, 1983-84, 1986-87, 1987- 88, 1993-94, 1997-98, 1998-99, 2003-04, 2004-05, 2005-06, 2009-10, 2016-17

P. Sen Memorial Invitation Trophy
Champions (10): 1976-77, 1978-79, 1993-94, 1997-98, 1999-2000, 2001-02, 2003-04, 2011-12, 2013-14, 2016-17

A. N. Ghosh Memorial Trophy
Champions (8): 1992-93, 1996-97, 1997-98, 1998-99, 2000-01, 2013-14, 2014-15, 2015-16

CAB Super League
Champions (1): 2016-17

References

East Bengal Club
Cricket in West Bengal
Sports clubs in Kolkata